Shyamal Bagchee (born 1945 in Kolkata) is a Canadian poet, scholar, photographer, and critic. He is particularly interested in critical theory, poetry and poetics, as well as their socio-cultural and philosophical underpinnings. In 1981 Bagchee earned his doctoral degree from York University in Toronto before joining University of Alberta to teach English literature, Literary Theory (in particular Postmodernism and Postmodernity) and Cultural Studies, (1982 Assistant Professor, 1985 Associate Professor, 1991 Full Professor, 2015 Professor Emeritus--to date).

History 
During his years in Toronto, Shyamal Bagchee was  closely mentored by Sir William Empson. While still a graduate student, Bagchee launched the refereed journal Yeats Eliot Review. YER drew original critical essays and reviews by leading Modernist scholars from across the world. The journal moved to a US university in 1989. 

Bagchee has published scholarly papers on a wide variety of literary topics and authors as diverse as Cyril Tourneur, Thomas Dekker, Henry King, romantic theories, William Blake, symbolism, Thomas Carlyle, Walter Pater, 19th and 20th Century American Studies, cultural studies, aesthetics, philosophy of ethics, socialism, early and later modernism, W.B. Yeats, T. S. Eliot, Virginia Woolf, Yvor Winters, on Canadian poetry by Al Purdy, P.K. Page and Irving Layton, on Postmodernism, Post-Structuralism, Deconstruction, Influence Studies, Eroticism, and  Pornography. He has edited several volumes of original essays: T.S. Eliot Annual No. 1 (Macmillan, UK, 1989), A Voice Descanting: T.S. Eliot Centennial Essays (Palgrave Macmillan, UK, 1990, and St. Martin’s Press, USA, 1990), Perspectives on O’Neill (ELS Monographs, Univ. of Victoria, 1988), and with Elisabeth Daumer, International Reception of T.S. Eliot (Continuum/Bloomsbury, UK, 2007).     

In 1988 Bagchee delivered the Eliot Centennial Address at University of Arkansas where he was also awarded a special Eliot Centennial Citation. Two years later he presented The T.S. Eliot Society of America’s 11th  Eliot Memorial Lecture ] in the poet’s city of birth, St. Louis, Missouri. In 2001 Bagchee was elected President of The T.S. Eliot Society of America (now The International T.S. Eliot Society) for three years Other positions held by him include Chair, Board of Directors of University of Alberta Press, and a Director of Shastri Indo-Canadian Institute. He also served on the Institute’s Executive Committee, and as Chair of its Canadian Studies Committee.   

Bagchee’s  has published two volumes of his verse: Gabardine and Other Poems (Toronto: TSAR Books, 2006), and A Scrupulous Meanness and Other Poems (Ottawa: Buschek Books, 2007). A third compilation of poems tentatively titled Zero ZonesNightsoil,  is currently is in the press. 

In 1997 on the 50th anniversary of Canadian Citizenship Act of 1947, Bagchee was awarded a Distinguished New Canadian Award for Creative Arts.

References 

1945 births
Living people
People from Kolkata
Indian emigrants to Canada
Canadian male poets
York University alumni
Academic staff of the University of Alberta
Naturalized citizens of Canada
21st-century Canadian poets
21st-century Canadian writers